Dendriscosticta is a genus of foliose lichens in the family Peltigeraceae. The genus was circumscribed in 2013 by lichenologists Bibiana Moncada and Robert Lücking  with Dendriscosticta wrightii assigned as the type species. The genus, a segregate of Sticta, was created to contain species in the Sticta wrightii clade. Dendriscosticta has a sister taxon relationship with the genera Yoshimuriella and Lobariella. Dendriscosticta is distinguished from Sticta by the presence of algae in the excipulum.

Species
 Dendriscosticta gelida 
 Dendriscosticta hookeri 
 Dendriscosticta insinuans 
 Dendriscosticta oroborealis 
 Dendriscosticta phyllidiata 
 Dendriscosticta platyphylla 
 Dendriscosticta platyphylloides 
 Dendriscosticta praetextata 
 Dendriscosticta wrightii 
 Dendriscosticta yatabeana

References

Peltigerales
Peltigerales genera
Lichen genera
Taxa described in 2013
Taxa named by Robert Lücking